Pick of the Litter may refer to:

 Pick of the Litter (film), a 2018 documentary about guide dogs for the blind
 Pick of the Litter (manga), a series published from 2004 to 2007
 Pick of the Litter (The Spinners album), 1975
 Pick of the Litter (Wolfstone album), 1997
 The Definition of X: The Pick of the Litter, 2007 album by DMX